Piedade is a municipality in the state of São Paulo in Brazil. It is part of the Metropolitan Region of Sorocaba. The population is 55,542 (2020 est.) in an area of 746.87 km². The elevation is 781 m.

The municipality contains part of the  Jurupará State Park, created in 1992.

Neighboring Cities
 Ibiúna
 Pilar do Sul
 Salto de Pirapora
 Tapiraí
 Votorantim

References

Municipalities in São Paulo (state)